Dimitri Pavlovitch Riabouchinsky (6 November 1882– 22 August 1962) was a Russian fluid dynamicist noted for his discovery of the Riabouchinsky solid technique. With the aid of Nikolay Zhukovsky he founded the Institute of Aerodynamics in 1904, the first in Europe. He also independently discovered equivalent results to the Buckingham Pi Theorem in 1911. Riabouchinsky left Russia following the October Revolution and his short-term arrest, spending the rest of his life in Paris, yet he never accepted the French citizenship and used his Nansen passport up till death. He was a member of the Moscow State University, the University of Paris, the French Academy of Sciences as well as one of the co-founders of the Russian Higher Technical School in France. Over 200 scientific works were published during his lifetime. He was an Invited Speaker of the ICM in 1920 at Strasbourg, in 1928 at Bologna, and in 1932 at Zurich.

Notes

External links 

 Рябушинский Дмитрий Павлович
 Воспоминания о Рябушинском. Лекция из цикла «Выдающиеся ученые — математики и механики» в мемориальном кабинете-музее Л. И. Седова 
 «Российский научный некрополь за рубежом» РЯБУШИНСКИЙ (Riabouchinsky, Riaboushinsky) Дмитрий Павлович
 Dimitri Pavlovitch Riabouchinsky (1882-1962)

1882 births
1962 deaths
Scientists from Moscow
Scientists from Paris
Fluid dynamicists
Members of the French Academy of Sciences
Academic staff of Moscow State University
Academic staff of the University of Paris
Aerodynamicists
Aviation pioneers